Robi Darwis (born 22 August 2003) is an Indonesian professional footballer who plays as a defensive midfielder for Liga 1 club Persib Bandung and the Indonesia national under-20 team.

Club career

Persib Bandung
He was signed for Persib Bandung and played in Liga 1 in 2022-2023 season. Darwis made his league debut on 24 July 2022 in a match against Bhayangkara at the Wibawa Mukti Stadium, Cikarang.

International career
On 14 September 2022, Robi made his debut for Indonesia U-20 national team against Timor-Leste U-20, in which he made two assists, in a 4–0 win in the 2023 AFC U-20 Asian Cup qualification. In October 2022, it was reported that Robi received a call-up from the Indonesia U-20 for a training camp, in Turkey and Spain.

Career statistics

Club

Notes

References

External links
 Robi Darwis at Soccerway
 Robi Darwis at Liga Indonesia

2003 births
Living people
People from Cianjur
Sportspeople from West Java
Indonesian footballers
Liga 1 (Indonesia) players
Persib Bandung players
Bandung United F.C. players
Indonesia youth international footballers
Association football midfielders